"Too Close" is a song by American R&B group Next featuring uncredited vocals from Vee of Koffee Brown. It contains a sample of "Christmas Rappin" by Kurtis Blow and was released on January 27, 1998, as the second single from their debut album, Rated Next (1997). The song reached number one on the US Hot 100 and R&B charts, topping the former for four consecutive weeks, and has gone platinum, making it their biggest and best-known hit.

Composition
According to Billboard, on the song "R.L, Terry and Raphael moan and groan about their female dance partner's grindin' and shakin' -- and their respective bulges as a result -- atop a Chicago-style step dance production."

Charts

Weekly charts

Year-end charts

Decade-end charts

All-time charts

Certifications

Release history

Blue version

In 2001, English boy band Blue released a cover version of the song as the second single from their debut studio album All Rise (2001). The track was released on August 27, 2001, and became their first number one UK single produced by Ray Ruffin. "Too Close" also reached number five in Australia, number 17 in Ireland, and number one in New Zealand, where the Next version had also been a number-one hit. The song has received a silver sales status certification for sales of over 200,000 copies in the UK.

Music video
The band traveled to New York City to film the music video, and whilst there, they witnessed the attacks on the World Trade Center. The following month, Blue were being interviewed by British newspaper The Sun and singer Lee Ryan commented that "This New York thing is being blown out of proportion" and asked "What about whales? They are ignoring animals that are more important. Animals need saving and that's more important." The other members of the band tried to silence Ryan, but he went on. After The Sun quoted Ryan as saying "Who gives a fuck about New York when elephants are being killed?", this caused a huge media backlash that resulted in Blue losing their U.S. record deal and campaigns to sack Ryan from the group.

Track listings
UK and Australian CD single
 "Too Close" (radio edit) – 3:45
 "Too Close" (Blacksmith R&B club rub) – 5:41
 "Too Close" (instrumental) – 3:45
 "Too Close" (video) – 3:45

UK cassette single and European CD single
 "Too Close" (radio edit) – 3:45
 "Too Close" (Blacksmith R&B club rub) – 5:41

Credits and personnel
Credits are taken from the All Rise album booklet.

Studios
 Recorded at Ruffland Studios (London, England) and Cutfather & Joe Studios (Copenhagen, Denmark)
 Mixed at White Room (Copenhagen, Denmark)
 Mastered at Sterling Sound (New York City) and Sony Music Studios (London, England)

Personnel

 Kier Gist – writing
 Darren Lighty – writing
 Robert Huggar – writing
 Raphael Brown – writing
 Robert Ford Jr. – writing
 Denzil Miller – writing
 James B. Moore – writing
 Kurtis Walker – writing
 Larry Smith – writing
 Blue – lead vocals
 Ray Ruffin – additional backing vocals, keys, programming, production
 Awsa – additional backing vocals
 Andrew Smith – guitars
 Glen Scott – additional keyboards
 Cutfather & Joe – additional keyboards, additional production and mix
 Mads Nilsson – mixing
 Tom Coyne – mastering
 John Davis – mastering

Charts

Weekly charts

Year-end charts

Certifications

Release history

Parodies
In 2015, the song regained attention through the popularity of the internet meme, "Why You Always Lying" by Nicholas Fraser. The parody gained fame within social media (most notably Vine and Twitter) because of the comically poor production quality and relatable theme. Replacing the line "Baby when we're grinding" with "Why the fuck you lying," and similarly for following phrases, the song initially referenced an untrustworthy girl who failed to keep her promise of hooking him up with her cute friend. Currently, the original Vine has been viewed over 76.1 million times, and has been extended into a full music video for YouTube, which has gained over 29 million views as of November 2020. Fraser also performed the parody along with the former Next member RL on the MTV2 show Uncommon Sense with Charlamagne.

In 2021, comedian Munya Chawawa posted a parody of the song with lyrics changed to reflect the panic buying of petrol and diesel fuel that occurred across the United Kingdom in September 2021 during the 2021 United Kingdom fuel supply crisis which in turn caused further panic from the British public. The lyrics to the chorus were changed to "Britain’s panic buying/Petrol pumps are dying/Said Brexit would be fine and turns out they were lying/Fuel is running real low/ Need European blokes/ To come through in their HGVs”.

References

1990s ballads
1997 songs
1998 singles
2001 singles
Arista Records singles
Billboard Hot 100 number-one singles
Blue (English band) songs
Innocent Records singles
Music videos directed by Bille Woodruff
Music videos directed by Jake Nava
Number-one singles in New Zealand
Song recordings produced by Cutfather & Joe
Songs written by KayGee
UK Singles Chart number-one singles
Virgin Records singles
Songs about dancing